Raja Chulan ibni Almarhum Sultan Abdullah Muhammad Shah II  Habibullah KBE (1 July 1869 – 10 April 1933) was a member of the Perak royal family. He was born on 1 July 1869 at Tanjung, Brambong. He was the son of Sultan Abdullah Muhammad Shah II.

Having obtained his education from the Malacca High School and the Malay College Kuala Kangsar, he joined with the British, as well as with the sultans of Perak, Selangor, Negeri Sembilan and Pahang to form a federation, dubbed the Federated Malay States, on 1 July 1896, the nucleus around which the present-day Malaysia was eventually created.

He later became a member of the Federal Law Committee in 1924. Raja Chulan had also urged the British to improve the Malay people's economic standing and their access to employment in the civil service. He was made an honorary CMG in 1925.

Death and legacy
He died on 10 April 1933 and was buried in the Al-Ghufran Royal Mausoleum, Kuala Kangsar, Perak.

In Kuala Lumpur, there is a street, MBE (formerly Weld Road) which was renamed after him in 1982, as well as a monorail station along that street.

Publications
 Misa Melayu; edited by R. O. Winstedt. Singapore: Methodist Publishing House, 1919 (reissued in 1966 by Pustaka Antara, Kuala Lumpur).

References

1869 births
1933 deaths
Royal House of Perak
Heirs apparent who never acceded
Sons of monarchs